The  was the main field gun deployed by the Imperial Japanese Army in the Russo-Japanese War of 1904–1905.

Description
The Type 31 was introduced in 1898, with the "Type 31" designation indicating that the gun was developed in 31st year of reign of Emperor Meiji.  Designed by Colonel Arisaka Nariakira, it had a barrel made of steel, which improved the range and accuracy of the gun over the earlier 7 cm mountain gun, which had a bronze barrel.
The Type 31 used smokeless powder cartridge shots, and had a semi-rigid recoil system using cables connected to a set of springs. It had a range of approximately 7,800 meters, using a 6 kilogram explosive shot. The Type 31 also came in a lighter mountain gun version, which had a shorter range (4,300 meters).
Approximately 620 were produced and deployment to combat units was completed by 1902. The gun remained in service to the end of World War II.

Foreign users
About one hundred Type 31 guns were sold to the Russian Empire in 1916. About 50 of these later surfaced in the Red Army during Finnish Civil War, and ultimately 44 guns were appropriated by Finland when the hostilities ceased. These guns were designated 75 VK 98. Forty-two of these guns, together with  28,000 shells, were sold again in 1937 to republican Spain in the ongoing Spanish Civil War. The chartered Estonian transport Yorbrook, carrying guns and ammunition, was intercepted in the Bay of Biscay by the Spanish cruiser Canarias shortly before the Battle of Cape Machichaco on 5 March 1937. During the battle, the Yorbrook was escorted by republican forces to enter the port of Bermeo, but it is unknown if the guns were dumped at sea or offloaded in Bermeo.

References
 War Department TM-E-30-480 Handbook on Japanese Military Forces September 1944

External links

 http://www3.plala.or.jp/takihome/Type31.htm

Notes

3
Artillery of Japan
Russo-Japanese war weapons of Japan
Mountain artillery
75 mm artillery
Weapons and ammunition introduced in 1898